Alex Ross Tait (born 13 June 1972) is a New Zealand cricketer. He played in five One Day Internationals for New Zealand in the late 1990s.

In 1996-97 Tait took 9/48 in the first innings and 16/130 in the match for the Northern Districts against Auckland at Seddon Park, Hamilton. His first innings haul was a record for Northern Districts and his match figures were the best in New Zealand first-class cricket.

Tait has also played for the Northland in the Hawke Cup competition.

References

External links
 

1972 births
Living people
New Zealand cricketers
New Zealand One Day International cricketers
Northern Districts cricketers
Cricketers at the 1998 Commonwealth Games
Commonwealth Games bronze medallists for New Zealand
People from the Kaipara District
Commonwealth Games medallists in cricket
Medallists at the 1998 Commonwealth Games